Douglas Laycock is the Robert E. Scott Distinguished Professor at the University of Virginia School of Law, and a leading scholar in the areas of religious liberty and the law of remedies. He also serves as the 2nd Vice President of the American Law Institute and is an elected Fellow of the American Academy of Arts & Sciences.

Education 
Laycock received his bachelor's degree from Michigan State University and his J.D. from the University of Chicago Law School.

Academic career 
He was a professor at the University of Chicago Law School, the University of Texas School of Law, and the University of Michigan Law School, before he joined the faculty of the University of Virginia School of Law in the fall of 2010.

He was a member of the Panel of Academic Contributors for Black's Law Dictionary, 8th ed. (West Group, 2004). In addition, he was elected to the American Law Institute in 1983 and was elected to the ALI Council in May 2001. In 2008 and again in 2011, he was elected to three-year terms as ALI's 2nd Vice President.

Legal work and writings on religious liberty 
Laycock was one of the people who testified in favor of the Religious Liberty Protection Act of 1998. He has argued that exempting religious practices from regulation is constitutionally a good thing.  But he acknowledges limits to such exemptions; he has said that "Of course religious believers have no constitutional right to inflict significant harm on nonconsenting others."

He has represented parties in four Supreme Court cases on religious liberty.  He represented the Church of Lukumi Babalu Aye, successfully defending its right to sacrifice small animals in religious ceremonies.  He represented the Roman Catholic Archbishop of San Antonio in an unsuccessful defense of Congress's power to enact the Religious Freedom Restoration Act and apply it to the states.  And he represented anonymous parents and students in their successful objection to school-sponsored prayer at high school football games. Most recently, he successfully represented Hosanna-Tabor Lutheran Church in a case establishing the constitutional status of the ministerial exception.

He is one of three co-editors of the book Same Sex Marriage and Religious Liberty.  His own chapter in that volume argues that it is desirable, and usually possible, to protect the liberty of same-sex couples and also protect the liberty of religious conservatives who do not wish to support or facilitate same-sex marriages.

In the field of remedies, he is the author of a casebook, Modern American Remedies, and a monograph, The Death of the Irreparable Injury Rule. He has also written a history of the field.

Awards 
In 2012, the International Center for Law and Religion Studies and J. Reuben Clark Law School of Brigham Young University presented Laycock their International Religious Liberty Award.

Personal life
He is married to Teresa A. Sullivan, who served as the first female president of the University of Virginia from 2010 to 2018.

References

 UofM faculty bio
 UT faculty bio

Year of birth missing (living people)
Living people
University of Chicago alumni
Michigan State University alumni
University of Texas at Austin faculty
University of Chicago faculty
University of Michigan faculty
American lawyers
University of Virginia School of Law faculty
Members of the American Law Institute